Ramswaroop Ram  was an Indian politician. He was elected to the Lok Sabha, the lower house of the Parliament of India, from Gaya in Bihar, as a member of the Indian National Congress.

References

External links
Official biographical sketch in Parliament of India website

1942 births
2009 deaths
Indian National Congress politicians
India MPs 1984–1989
India MPs 1980–1984